Born Again is a 2020 South Korean television series starring Jang Ki-yong, Jin Se-yeon, and Lee Soo-hyuk. It tells the story of two men and one woman who become involved in the 1980s and again in the present day through reincarnation and fate. The series aired on KBS2 from April 20 to June 9, 2020 on Mondays and Tuesdays at 22:00 (KST) time slot.

Synopsis
Born Again tells the story of three reincarnated souls that have been intertwined together by fate.

In the 1980s, Gong Ji-chul (Jang Ki-yong) was a lone wolf who defies his evil father and an elite medical student in the present.

In the 1980s, Jung Ha-eun (Jin Se-yeon) was the owner of a used bookstore "Old Future". Unfortunately, she has suffered congenital cardiomyopathy and could die at any moment. In the present-day, she is archaeologist who uncovers the skeletal remains of the nameless, and restores their stories to them.

In the 1980s, Cha Hyung-bin (Lee Soo-hyuk) was a detective who loves only one person and in the present is a prosecutor who believes in a "criminal gene".

The three become involved in a passionate love triangle that endures beyond death and time.

Cast

Main
 Jang Ki-yong as Gong Ji-chul / Cheon Jong-bum
 Jin Se-yeon as Jung Ha-eun / Jung Sa-bin
 Lee Soo-hyuk as Cha Hyung-bin / Kim Soo-hyuk

Supporting

1980s
 Jung In-gum as Gong In-woo
 Cho Deok-hoo as Cheon Suk-tae
 Wi Ji-yeon as Jang Hye-mi
 Jang Hee-song as Jung Sung-eun

Present
 Choi Kwang-il as Cheon Suk-tae
 Kim Jung-young as Heo Jin-kyung
 Park Sang-hoon as Cheon Jong-woo
 Kim Jung-nan as Jang Hye-mi
 Lee Seo-el as Baek Sang-ah
 Park Chul-ho as Jung Sung-eun
 Lee Myung-ho as bar owner
 Kim Jun-bae as bar chef
 Jang Won-young as Joo In-do
 Kim Min-sun as Goo Joo-hye
 Kim Joong-don as Gu Hyul-ki
 Han Hae-rim as Yoo Seo-young
 Cha Min-ji as Jay
 Choi Dae-chul as Seo Tae-ha
 Kim Do-kyung as Jang Ma-chul
 Park Young-soo as Chang-soon
Special appearance
 Song Yoo-hyun as Lim Hwa-young

Original soundtrack

Viewership
In this table,  represent the lowest ratings and  represent the highest ratings.

Notes

References

External links
  
 Born Again at Monster Union 
 Born Again at UFO Production 
 
 
 

Korean Broadcasting System television dramas
2020 South Korean television series debuts
2020 South Korean television series endings
Korean-language television shows
South Korean melodrama television series
South Korean mystery television series
Television series by Monster Union